John Moles (22 September 1949 – 4 October 2015) was Professor of Latin, a lecturer at Newcastle University and previously served as head of the classics department at Durham University.

Moles was the founder of Histos in 1997, an early example of on-line journal of ancient historiography. His first two published books were on chess, and he was twice the Ulster chess champion while at the Royal Belfast Academical Institution, going on to become the Irish Champion in 1966 and 1971, with the distinction of being a member of the Chess Olympiad team in 1970 and 1972.

In 2005, Moles was part of the expert panel on Cynicism for BBC Radio 4's In Our Time.

Selected publications

References 

Academics of Newcastle University
Academics of Durham University
British historians
British chess players
Irish chess players
Chess Olympiad competitors
2015 deaths
1949 births